The following is a list of notable water parks in the world sorted by region. A water park or waterpark is an amusement park that features water play areas, such as water slides, splash pads, spraygrounds (water playgrounds), lazy rivers, wave pools, or other recreational bathing, swimming, and barefooting environments.

Africa

Americas

Asia

Europe

Oceania

Defunct water parks

Canada 

 Wild Rapids Waterslide Park, Sylvan Lake, Alberta – closed in 2016
 Froster Soak City at Ontario Place, Toronto, Ontario – closed in 2012

Japan 

 Seagaia Ocean Dome, Miyazaki – closed as of 2007
 Sports World Izunagaoka, Shizuoka
 Wild Blue Yokohama, Yokohama

Netherlands 
 Nationaal Zwemcentrum de Tongelreep, Eindhoven – the recreational part has been closed since September 2016

Palestinian territories 
 Crazy Water Park, Gaza Strip – burned down in arson attack

Russia 
 Transvaal Park, Moscow – in 2004, 28 people were killed when a roof collapsed

United Kingdom 
 Fantaseas, Dartford, Kent and Chingford, London
 Leith Waterworld, Edinburgh

United States 

 Big Surf, Tempe
 CoCo Key Water Resort, Omaha
 Disney's River Country, Lake Buena Vista, Florida
 Fort Rapids, Columbus, Ohio
 Heritage USA, Fort Mill, South Carolina
 Key Lime Cove, Gurnee, Illinois; now named Great Wolf Lodge
 Lake Dolores Waterpark, Newberry Springs, California
 Manteca Waterslides, Manteca, California
 Maui Sands Resort & Indoor Water Park, Sandusky
 Pleasure Island, Muskegon, Michigan
 Six Flags Atlantis, Hollywood, Florida
 Splash Amarillo Waterpark, Amarillo, Texas
 Splash Down Dunes, Porter, Indiana
 Splash Kingdom Waterpark, Redlands
 Splashtown San Antonio, San Antonio, Texas
 Water Park of America, Bloomington, Minnesota
 Wet 'n Wild, Garland, Texas
 Wet 'n Wild Orlando, Orlando, Florida
 Wild Waters, Ocala, Florida
 Wildwater Kingdom, Aurora, Ohio

Vietnam 
 Hồ Thủy Tiên
 Saigon Water Park, Ho Chi Minh City

See also 
 List of amusement parks

References

External links 

 Waterparks.com – World Waterpark Association's consumer guide

Lists of amusement parks

Lists by country